Cesare Paciotti (born 1 January 1958) is a shoe designer from Italy. His eponymous company makes luxury shoes and other leather goods, including jewelry and watches, and he is famous for its dagger logo.

Biography
Cesare Paciotti was born from the marriage between Cecilia and Giuseppe Paciotti in Civitanova Marche, a small city in the province of Macerata in central Italy (on the east side facing the Adriatic sea).  His father had founded a shoe company in 1948. Cesare studied at the prestigious DAMS (Drama, Art and Music Studies) degree course of the University of Bologna and then travelled around the world before inheriting the family business in 1980. He took the main creative role at the newly renamed Cesare Paciotti company, whilst his sister Paola looked after operational matters.
He has two children, Ludovica and Giuseppe Paciotti from his first wife and a three-year girl from his second marriage.

Lines
There are three labels owned by the company Cesare Paciotti: Cesare Paciotti and Cesare Paciotti 4US, dedicated to the production and selling of shoes and bags; "Cesare Paciotti Jewels" is the collection of jewellery.

Notes and references

External links
Cesare Paciotti website

Italian fashion designers
1958 births
Living people
People from Civitanova Marche
Clothing brands of Italy
High fashion brands
Luxury brands
Jewellery companies of Italy
Shoe companies of Italy
Watch manufacturing companies of Italy
Manufacturing companies established in 1948
Design companies established in 1980
1948 establishments in Italy
1980 establishments in Italy